Sir William Thompson (1678 – 27 October 1739) of Middle Temple, was an English judge and Whig politician who sat in the House of Commons between 1709 and 1729.

Early life
Thompson was second son of Sir William Thompson (died 1695), serjeant-at-law, and his wife, Mary Stephens of Bermondsey. He was educated at Brentwood Grammar School (Essex) and admitted at Trinity College, Cambridge on 25 April 1691, aged 14. He was awarded BA in 1695. 

In 1688, he was admitted  a student at the Middle Temple, where he was called to the bar in 1698. He married by licence dated 16 July 1701, Mrs Joyce Brent, a widow of St Clement Danes, Middlesex. He married, as his second wife, on 7 November 1710, Julia Blackett, widow of Sir William Blacket, Bt, of Newcastle-upon-Tyne and the daughter of Sir Christopher Conyers, Bt,  of Horden, Durham.

Career
Thompson stood for Orford, Suffolk at the 1708 British general election on the recommendation of Sir Thomas Felton, 4th Baronet and though defeated in the poll with only three votes, was seated on petition  as Member of Parliament for Orford on 29 January 1709. He voted for the naturalization of the Palatines, and was probably  a teller on 7 March 1709 against a Tory amendment to the bill to prevent naturalized persons from standing or voting at parliamentary elections. He was put forward to sit on the committee to draw up the articles of impeachment against Dr Sacheverell on 14 December 1709, spoke on 11 January 1710 against the recommittal of the articles, and voted for the impeachment. He was involved in the prosecution of Sacheverell's riotous supporters, Daniel Dammaree, Francis Willis, and George Purchase over the period March to April 1710.  At the 1710 British general election he stood at Ipswich but was unsuccessful. At the 1713 general election, he was returned as MP for Ipswich but was unseated by petition on 1 April 1714.

Thompson regained the seat in the 1715 general election, and retained it until his elevation to the exchequer bench in November 1729. He took part in the impeachment of the Jacobite George Seton, 5th Earl of Wintoun, 15–19 March 1716, Appointed for the solicitor-generalship, 24 January 1717, he was dismissed from that office, 17 March 1720, for bringing an unfounded charge of corrupt practices against attorney-general Nicholas Lechmere. Retaining the recordership, he was accorded in 1724 precedence in all courts after the solicitor-general. On 23 May 1726 he was appointed cursitor baron, and on 27 November 1729 he succeeded Sir Bernard Hale as puisne Baron of the Exchequer, having first been called to the degree of serjeant-at-law (17 November) This office with the recordership he retained until his death at Bath, 27 October 1739.

He bought the manor of Hensington from the executors of Thomas Napier in 1726. His devisees sold it in 1753 to Charles Spencer, 3rd Duke of Marlborough.

In 1717 William Thomson introduced an act into the House of Commons that eventually became law in 1718 (4 Geo I, c.11).  Known as the Transportation Act 1717 (a.k.a. Piracy Act), the Transportation Act formalized the process for transporting British criminals (except Scottish) to the American colonies.  Seen as a way to reduce crime in Britain felons who committed clergyable offenses could be transported for 7 years and receivers of stolen goods could be transported for 14 years. This act of Thomson's resulted in tens of thousands of convicts being transported to the American colonies (including Canada and the West Indies) and later to Australia between 1718 and the end of transportation in 1867.

Family
Thompson died on 27 October 1739. He had no children by either wife.

References

Sources
Attribution

1678 births
1739 deaths
Alumni of Trinity College, Cambridge
Members of the Middle Temple
Members of Lincoln's Inn
Serjeants-at-law (England)
Solicitors General for England and Wales
Barons of the Exchequer
Knights Bachelor
Politics of Suffolk
Members of the Parliament of Great Britain for Ipswich
British MPs 1715–1722
British MPs 1722–1727
British MPs 1727–1734